The 2022 Città di Forlì IV was a professional tennis tournament played on indoor hard courts. It was the sixth edition of the tournament which was part of the 2022 ATP Challenger Tour. It took place in Forlì, Italy between 14 and 20 February 2022.

Singles main-draw entrants

Seeds

 1 Rankings as of 7 February 2022.

Other entrants
The following players received wildcards into the singles main draw:
  Matteo Arnaldi
  Matteo Gigante
  Stefano Napolitano

The following players received entry into the singles main draw as alternates:
  João Domingues
  Giulio Zeppieri

The following players received entry from the qualifying draw:
  Evan Furness
  Benjamin Hassan
  Emilio Nava
  Zsombor Piros
  Tim van Rijthoven
  Yosuke Watanuki

The following player received entry as a lucky loser:
  Hiroki Moriya

Champions

Singles

  Jack Draper def.  Tim van Rijthoven 6–1, 6–2.

Doubles

  Victor Vlad Cornea /  Fabian Fallert def.  Antonio Šančić /  Igor Zelenay 6–4, 3–6, [10–2].

References

Città di Forlì IV
2022 in Italian sport
February 2022 sports events in Italy